The 2020 Minnesota Democratic presidential primary took place on March 3, 2020, as one of 15 contests scheduled on Super Tuesday in the Democratic Party primaries for the 2020 presidential election, following the South Carolina primary the weekend before. The Minnesota primary, only the fifth in the state's history and the first since 1992, was an open primary, with the state awarding 91 delegates towards the 2020 Democratic National Convention, of which 75 were pledged delegates allocated on the basis of the results of the primary. Early voting was possible for just over six weeks beginning January 17, 2020.

Former vice president Joe Biden had played virtually no role in the polls heading into the primary but benefitted from the withdrawal and endorsement of senator Amy Klobuchar on the previous day, the original front-runner in her home state, and won with almost 39% of the vote, gathering 38 delegates and winning in 76 counties. Senator Bernie Sanders lost many counties he had won in 2016, when he won the state easily by double digit margins against Hillary Clinton, and placed second with around 30% and 27 delegates, his only strongholds having been in college towns, St. Cloud and the Minneapolis and St. Paul city limits. While senator Elizabeth Warren narrowly surpassed the 15% threshold and won 10 delegates, former mayor Michael Bloomberg and Klobuchar, who despite her withdrawal had carried a number of counties due to early voting, placed fourth and fifth without winning delegates.

Procedure
Minnesota was one of 14 states and one territory holding primaries on March 3, 2020, also known as "Super Tuesday". While Party-run caucuses were still held in the state, they no longer included or influenced the presidential nomination question. Then-governor Mark Dayton had signed a bill on May 22, 2016, matching a national trend for the change from a traditional caucus system to presidential nominating contests, marking the first binding Democratic primary in the state since 1956 (as the primary ordered by state law in 1992 had been ignored by the party and was therefore non-binding).

Absentee voting began on January 17, 2020. A legal challenge was brought jointly by James Martin and a Republican candidate threatening to disrupt the process, but was denied by the Minnesota Supreme Court. Voting on Super Tuesday took place from 7:00 a.m. until 8:00 p.m. in much of the state, with voting in certain townships starting at 10:00 a.m. Under Minnesota's open primary law, there were no qualifications that a candidate had to meet in order for that candidate's name to be printed on a primary ballot excepting only being included in the notice provided by the party's chair to the Minnesota Secretary of State; there were no restrictions as to what names the chair was allowed to give in its notice. Under state party rules, however, candidates had to meet a threshold of 15 percent at the congressional district or statewide level in order to be considered viable.

The 75 pledged delegates to the 2020 Democratic National Convention were allocated proportionally on the basis of the results of the primary. Of the 75 pledged delegates, between 4 and 10 were allocated to each of the state's 8 congressional districts and another 10 were allocated to party leaders and elected officials (PLEO delegates), in addition to 16 at-large delegates. The Super Tuesday primary as part of Stage I on the primary timetable received no bonus delegates, in order to disperse the primaries between more different date clusters and keep too many states from hoarding on the first shared date or on a March date in general.

Following so-called "organizing unit conventions" between March 7, 2020 and April 19, 2020 during which delegates for the congressional district and state conventions were nominated, the congressional district conventions took place between May 2, 2020 and May 29, 2020 to select national convention district delegates. The state convention to vote on the 16 at-large and 10 pledged PLEO delegates for the Democratic National Convention was planned to be held virtually on May 31, 2020, but the speaking portion of it (not the online elections) were postponed to a later date due to the protests following the murder of George Floyd. The delegation also included 16 unpledged PLEO delegates: 7 members of the Democratic National Committee, 7 members of Congress (both senators, notably Amy Klobuchar, and 5 representatives), the governor Tim Walz, and former vice president Walter Mondale.

Candidates
15 candidates and an uncommitted option were on the ballot in Minnesota:

Running

Joe Biden
Michael Bloomberg
Tulsi Gabbard
Bernie Sanders
Elizabeth Warren

Withdrawn

Michael Bennet
Cory Booker
Pete Buttigieg
Julian Castro
John Delaney
Amy Klobuchar
Deval Patrick
Tom Steyer
Marianne Williamson
Andrew Yang

Campaign

With the impeachment trial coming up and taking up the time of several of the top tier candidates, including Minnesota senator Amy Klobuchar, the start of early voting was extremely important to her and the state party. Several rallies featuring her and other top DFL officials were held on that day, January 17.

Amy Klobuchar suspended her campaign one day before Super Tuesday, after 100,000 voters had already requested early voting ballots. This is likely to have contributed to her receiving 5.6 percent of the vote, and coming in first in several counties.

Polling
Amy Klobuchar led in pre-election polling, but withdrew from the race the night before the election and endorsed Joe Biden (who went on to win Minnesota).

Results

Results by county

Analysis
Exit polls indicated Biden winning handily the white voters and older people, he also won by just 4 points the African American vote, in sharp contrast with the southern states, while Sanders won the non-white vote overall by a wide margin, young voters, as well as voters from the LGBTQ+ community

Notes

See also
 2020 Minnesota Republican presidential primary

References

External links
The Green Papers delegate allocation summary
Minnesota Democratic–Farmer–Labor Party delegate selection plan 
FiveThirtyEight Minnesota primary poll tracker

Minnesota Democratic
Democratic primary
2020